The 39th Legislative Assembly of Ontario was a legislature of the government of the Province of Ontario, Canada.  It officially opened November 29, 2007, and ended on June 1, 2011.  The membership was set by the 2007 Ontario general election on October 10, 2007.

It was controlled by a Liberal Party majority under Premier Dalton McGuinty.  The Official Opposition was the Progressive Conservative Party. It was initially led by John Tory but the leadership changed in 2009 when the PCs elected Tim Hudak as their new leader. The third party was the New Democrats led by Howard Hampton until they chose Andrea Horwath as their leader in 2009. The speaker was Steve Peters.

Sessions
There were two sessions of the 39th Legislature:

Timeline of the 39th Parliament of Ontario
 November 28, 2007: The legislature conducted a secret vote to elect the Speaker of the legislature. Liberal Party of Ontario Member of Provincial Parliament (MPP) Steve Peters is elected as Speaker defeating incumbent Michael A. Brown.  The former labour minister defeated Brown and three other candidates after four ballots.
 November 29, 2007: The session officially opened with the Speech from the Throne.
 February 23, 2008: John Tory's continued leadership of the Progressive Conservative party was endorsed by 66.9% of delegates at a leadership review.
 June 14, 2008: NDP leader Howard Hampton announced he would step down as party leader at the March 7, 2009 NDP leadership convention.
 June 20, 2008: A mini-cabinet shuffle of the Executive Council of Ontario saw David Caplan sworn in as Minister of Health and George Smitherman becoming Minister of Energy and Infrastructure.
 January 9, 2009: Progressive Conservative MPP Laurie Scott announced her resignation from the legislature to allow party leader John Tory, who had been without a seat since his defeat in Don Valley West in the 2007 election, to re-enter the legislature.
 March 5, 2009: In the Haliburton—Kawartha Lakes—Brock by-election following Scott's resignation, Tory was defeated by Liberal candidate Rick Johnson.
 March 6, 2009: John Tory resigned as Progressive Conservative leader pending the selection of an interim party leader.
 March 7, 2009: Andrea Horwath was elected leader of the Ontario NDP at the party's 2009 leadership convention.
 June 27, 2009: Tim Hudak was elected leader of the Progressive Conservative party at its 2009 leadership election and also became the new Leader of the Opposition.
 September 17, 2009: Eric Hoskins was elected as the MPP for the riding of St. Paul's following the resignation of Michael Bryant on June 7, 2009.
 February 4, 2010: Glenn Murray was elected as the MPP for the riding of Toronto-Centre following the resignation of George Smitherman on January 4, 2010.

Party standings

Seating plan

List of members

Standings changes since the 38th general election

Membership changes

Office holders
 Speaker: Steve Peters
 Premier: Dalton McGuinty (Liberal)
 Government House Leader: Monique Smith (Liberal)
 Deputy Government House Leader: Gerry Phillips (Liberal)
 Leader of the Opposition: Tim Hudak (PC)
 Opposition House Leader: John Yakabuski
 Leader of the Third Party: Andrea Horwath (NDP)
 House Leader of the Third Party: Peter Kormos (NDP)

Major legislation
 Bill 8, Food for Healthy Schools Act, 2008, Royal Assent April 27, 2008
 Bill 48, Payday Loans Act, 2008, Royal Assent June 18, 2008
 Bill 50, Provincial Animal Welfare Act, 2008, Second Reading, May 27, 20085,
 Bill 55, Ontario French-language Educational Communications Authority Act, 2008, Royal Assent June 18, 2008
 Bill 64, Cosmetic Pesticides Ban Act, 2008, Royal Assent June 18, 2008
 Bill 66, Toronto Public Transit Service Resumption Act, 2008, Royal Assent April 27, 2008
 Bill 90, Colleges Collective Bargaining Act, 2008, Second Reading June 12, 2008

Committees

There are two forms which committees can take.  The first, standing committees, are struck for the duration of the Parliament pursuant to Standing Orders.  The second, select committees, are struck usually by a Motion or an Order of the House to consider a specific Bill or issue which would otherwise monopolize the time of the standing committees.

Standing Committees

Standing committees in the current Parliament

 Standing Committee on Estimates
 Standing Committee on Finance and Economic Affairs
 Standing Committee on General Government
 Standing Committee on Government Agencies
 Standing Committee on Social Policy

 Standing Committee on Justice Policy
 Standing Committee on Public Accounts
 Standing Committee on Regulations and Private Bills
 Standing Committee on the Legislative Assembly

Select committees in the current Parliament

The 39th Parliament had 3 select committees.

 The Select Committee on Elections was struck, by a motion of the House, on June 11, 2008.  It completed its work on June 29, 2009.
 The Select Committee on Mental Health and Addictions was struck, by a motion of the House, on February 24, 2009.  It completed its work on August 24, 2010.
 The Select Committee on the proposed transaction of the TMX Group and the London Stock Exchange Group was struck, by a motion of the House, on February 23, 2011.  It completed its work on April 19, 2011.

References

External links
 Legislative Assembly of Ontario. 

Terms of the Legislative Assembly of Ontario
2007 establishments in Ontario
2011 disestablishments in Ontario